Gladson Dungdung (born 2 May 1980) is a human rights activist researcher, writer, motivator and public speaker based in Ranchi, India. He is founder of the Adivasis Publications, Adivasis Hunkar and Jharkhand Human Rights Movement.

Early life
He comes from the Kharia Adivasi community in Jharkhand (India). His family was displaced for an irrigation project built at Chhinda River in Simdega district of Jharkhand in 1980. His parents were brutally killed in June 1990 while they were going to attend the civil court, Simdega in a land related dispute of a family in the village. Consequently, he has had to undergo through a long struggle for survival. He was unable to get admission in the college for lack of Rs. 250. He worked as daily wage labourer, cycle mechanic and helper in tea shop.

He was one of the first authors published by Adivaani with the English language book "Whose Country is it Anyway?", launched in 2013 at the New Delhi World Book Fair.

He has spoken internationally on human rights issues, including police atrocities and gross violation of the rights of indigenous peoples.

Issues with the government
His passport was taken in January 2014, following "a sensitive report from state police" related to his travel to Germany and Thailand to speak about the gross human rights violation. He reported refusing to pay bribes during his passport application process. In May 2016, he was also offloaded from a Delhi-London Air India flight, on his way to attend an international seminar highlighting the situation of Adivasis. On this occasion, he was branded an ‘anti-State and Maoist sympathizer’, even though he has always impartially criticized both sides in the Maoist conflict, and believes that criticism of wrongdoings by State officials should be understood in a positive light, as part of an effort to bring about changes for the better.

In 2016, his bank account with the State Bank of India was blocked in alleged suspicious of his involvement in money laundering. In June 2017, two cases were filed against him for protesting against the amendment of Chotanagpur Tanacy Act 1908 and Santhal Pargana Tanacy Act 1949, falsely accusing him for instigating the Adivasis for protesting against the Jharkhand government.

Books
He is the author of more than two dozen books, which includes:

 Adivasis and Their Forest. 
 Endless Cry in the Red Corridor.
 Mission Saranda: A War for Natural Resources in India.
 Whose country is it Anyway? – Untold Stories from India's Indigenous Peoples.
 Crossfire. 
 Asuron Ki Pida. 
 Adivasi aur Vanadhikar.
 Vikas Ke Kabargah.
 Jharkhand main Asmita Sangharsh.
 Ulgulan Ka Sauda.

He has edited two others: Nagri Ka Nagara and Jharkhand Human Rights Report, 2001-2011. He has also written more than 500 articles focused on human rights issues, Adivasi rights, displacement, politics and social change published in edited books, daily newspapers, magazines, journals and news web portals.

Speeches

He has spoken in the international seminars and conferences held in

 Hague (Netherlands), 
 Paris (France), 
 Geneva (Switzerland), 
 Copenhagen (Denmark), 
 Bonn, Berlin and Bad boll (Germany), 
 University of Sussex (England),
 Chiang Mai (Thailand).

He served as an honorary member in the Assessment and Monitoring Authority under the Planning Commission of India (Govt. of India) from May 2011 to April 2013, and was awarded the Samata Ratan Award, 2014, for his extraordinary work for the Adivasi communities of India.

References

Living people
Kharia people
People from Simdega district
Indian human rights activists
Indigenous activists
Date of birth missing (living people)
Adivasi writers
1980 births
Adivasi activists